Professor Gillian Wigglesworth is an Australian linguist, Redmond Barry Distinguished Professor in Linguistics and Applied Linguistics, and former Deputy Dean of the Faculty of Arts at The University of Melbourne.

Career
Wigglesworth holds a Ph.D. in Linguistics from La Trobe University (Melbourne, Australia),  She is a member of the School of Languages and Linguistics at the University of Melbourne, where she was founding Director of the Research Unit for Indigenous Language. She was Chief Investigator, with Jane Simpson and Patrick McConvell, in the Aboriginal Child Language Acquisition Projects, funded by ARC Discovery Grants (2004-2007, 2011-2015), and is currently Chief Investigator in the Australian Research Council (ARC) Centre of Excellence for the Dynamics of Language.  In 2016, she was also Deputy Dean of the Faculty of Arts at The University of Melbourne, and in 2011  she was the Vice President of the International Language Testing Association.

Research

Her research interests focus on language acquisition, including first language acquisition, second language acquisition, language teaching, testing and assessment, and bilingualism, particularly the home and school languages of Indigenous Australian children living in remote communities.

Key Publications 

(2005) Murray D. and G. Wigglesworth. First Language Support in Adult ESL in Australia. Sydney: Macquarie University.

(2007) Ng, B. and G. Wigglesworth. Bilingualism: an advanced resource book. Routledge.

(2008) Simpson, J. and G. Wigglesworth. Children's language and multilingualism: Indigenous language use at home and school. London: Continuum.

(2013) Meakins, F. and G. Wigglesworth. 'How much input is enough? Correlating comprehension and child language input in an endangered language.' Journal of Multilingual & Multicultural Development, Multilingual Matters, vol. 34, issue 2, pp. 171–188.

(2013) Loakes, D.,  K. Moses, G. Wigglesworth, J. Simpson and R. Billington. 'Children's language input: A study of a remote multilingual Indigenous Australian community.' Multilingua, vol. 32, issue 5, pp. 683–711.

(2018) Wigglesworth, G, J. Simpson & J. Vaughan (eds). Language Practices of Indigenous Children and Youth: The Transition from Home to School. London: Palgrave Macmillan UK.

See also
Second language writing
Neomy Storch

References

External links 
Home — School of Languages and Linguistics
Home — Research Unit for Indigenous Language
Home – Centre of Excellence for the Dynamics of Language

Applied linguists
Linguists from Australia
Academic staff of the University of Melbourne
La Trobe University alumni
Living people
Women linguists
University of Melbourne women
1944 births